

QI20A Red Deer

QI20AA Inactivated viral vaccines
Empty group

QI20AB Inactivated bacterial vaccines (including mycoplasma, toxoid and chlamydia)
QI20AB01 Mycobacteria

QI20AC Inactivated bacterial vaccines and antisera
Empty group

QI20AD Live viral vaccines
Empty group

QI20AE Live bacterial vaccines
Empty group

QI20AF Live bacterial and viral vaccines
Empty group

QI20AG Live and inactivated bacterial vaccines
Empty group

QI20AH Live and inactivated viral vaccines
Empty group

QI20AI Live viral and inactivated bacterial vaccines
Empty group

QI20AJ Live and inactivated viral and bacterial vaccines
Empty group

QI20AK Inactivated viral and live bacterial vaccines
Empty group

QI20AL Inactivated viral and inactivated bacterial vaccines
Empty group

QI20AM Antisera, immunoglobulin preparations, and antitoxins
Empty group

QI20AN Live parasitic vaccines
Empty group

QI20AO Inactivated parasitic vaccines
Empty group

QI20AP Live fungal vaccines
Empty group

QI20AQ Inactivated fungal vaccines
Empty group

QI20AR In vivo diagnostic preparations
Empty group

QI20AS Allergens
Empty group

QI20AT Colostrum preparations and substitutes
Empty group

QI20AU Other live vaccines
Empty group

QI20AV Other inactivated vaccines
Empty group

QI20AX Other immunologicals
Empty group

QI20B Reindeer

Empty group

QI20C Mink

QI20CA Inactivated viral vaccines
QI20CA01 Mink enteritis virus

QI20CB Inactivated bacterial vaccines (including mycoplasma, toxoid and chlamydia)
QI20CB01 Clostridium

QI20CC Inactivated bacterial vaccines and antisera
Empty group

QI20CD Live viral vaccines
QI20CD01 Mink distemper virus

QI20CE Live bacterial vaccines
Empty group

QI20CF Live bacterial and viral vaccines
Empty group

QI20CG Live and inactivated bacterial vaccines
Empty group

QI20CH Live and inactivated viral vaccines
QI20CH01 Live mink distemper virus + inactivated mink enteritis virus

QI20CI Live viral and inactivated bacterial vaccines
Empty group

QI20CJ Live and inactivated viral and bacterial vaccines
QI20CJ01 Live mink distemper virus + inactivated mink enteritis virus/parvovirus + inactivated clostridium + inactivated pseudomonas

QI20CK Inactivated viral and live bacterial vaccines
Empty group

QI20CL Inactivated viral and inactivated bacterial vaccines
QI20CL01 Mink enteritis virus/parvovirus + inactivated clostridium + inactivated pseudomonas
QI20CL02 Mink enteritis virus/parvovirus + inactivated clostridium

QI20CM Antisera, immunoglobulin preparations, and antitoxins
Empty group

QI20CN Live parasitic vaccines
Empty group

QI20CO Inactivated parasitic vaccines
Empty group

QI20CP Live fungal vaccines
Empty group

QI20CQ Inactivated fungal vaccines
Empty group

QI20CR In vivo diagnostic preparations
Empty group

QI20CS Allergens
Empty group

QI20CT Colostrum preparations and substitutes
Empty group

QI20CU Other live vaccines
Empty group

QI20CV Other inactivated vaccines
Empty group

QI20CX Other immunologicals
Empty group

QI20D Ferret

QI20DA Inactivated viral vaccines
Empty group

QI20DB Inactivated bacterial vaccines (including mycoplasma, toxoid and chlamydia)
Empty group

QI20DC Inactivated bacterial vaccines and antisera
Empty group

QI20DD Live viral vaccines
QI20DD01 Ferret distemper virus

QI20DE Live bacterial vaccines
Empty group

QI20DF Live bacterial and viral vaccines
Empty group

QI20DG Live and inactivated bacterial vaccines
Empty group

QI20DH Live and inactivated viral vaccines
Empty group

QI20DI Live viral and inactivated bacterial vaccines
Empty group

QI20DJ Live and inactivated viral and bacterial vaccines
Empty group

QI20DK Inactivated viral and live bacterial vaccines
Empty group

QI20DL Inactivated viral and inactivated bacterial vaccines
Empty group

QI20DM Antisera, immunoglobulin preparations, and antitoxins
Empty group

QI20DN Live parasitic vaccines
Empty group

QI20DO Inactivated parasitic vaccines
Empty group

QI20DP Live fungal vaccines
Empty group

QI20DQ Inactivated fungal vaccines
Empty group

QI20DR In vivo diagnostic preparations
Empty group

QI20DS Allergens
Empty group

QI20DT Colostrum preparations and substitutes
Empty group

QI20DU Other live vaccines
Empty group

QI20DV Other inactivated vaccines
Empty group

QI20DX Other immunologicals
Empty group

QI20E Snake

Empty group

QI20F Bee

Empty group

QI20X Others

QI20XE Live bacterial vaccines
QI20XE01 Mycobacterium

References

I20